Partibrejkers II is the second studio album by the Serbian garage rock/punk rock band Partibrejkers, released by Jugodisk in 1988.

Track listing 
All lyrics by Zoran Kostić, except for the tracks 4 and 5 written by Nebojša Antonijević. All music by Nebojša Antonijević, except track 10 co-written with Ljubiša Kostadinović.

Personnel 
Partibrejkers
 Nebojša Antonijević "Anton" — arranged by, guitar, producer
 Zoran Kostić "Cane" — lead vocals
 Vlada Funtek — drums
 Dime Todorov "Mune" — bass

Additional personnel
 Milan Ćirić — producer, arranged by, recorded by
 Miroslav Cvetković — recorded by (track 2)
 Branislav Petrović "Banana" — harmonica
 Goran Dimić — artwork by

References

External links
 Partibrejkers II at Discogs

1988 albums
Partibrejkers albums
Jugodisk albums